Five was a German-language basketball magazine. Its subtitle was Basketball for Life!. It was in circulation between 2003 and 2021.

History and profile
Five was first published in August 2003. The founders were André Voigt and Jan Hieronimi. As of 2008 André Voigt was also the editor-in-chief of Five. The magazine was published ten times a year by Park and Ride Sports GMBH in Munich. Its former headquarters was in Cologne. It reported news about NBA through its permanent staff in Portland. From 2007 the magazine published a supplement, Fünf, which featured articles about the German Basketball Bundesliga. Five ceased publication in September 2021.

References

External links
 Official website

2003 establishments in Germany
2021 disestablishments in Germany
Basketball magazines
Defunct magazines published in Germany
German-language magazines
Magazines established in 2003
Magazines disestablished in 2021
Magazines published in Munich
Mass media in Cologne
Sports magazines published in Germany
Ten times annually magazines